Eupatorium album, or white thoroughwort, is a herbaceous perennial plant in the family Asteraceae native from the eastern and southern United States, from eastern Texas to Connecticut, inland as far as Indiana.

As with other members of the genus Eupatorium, Eupatorium album flowers with large numbers of small white heads. The flower heads have 4-5 disc florets each, but no ray florets.

Eupatorium album is capable of hybridizing with other Eupatorium species including Eupatorium sessilifolium and Eupatorium serotinum.  Its appearance is similar to Eupatorium altissimum, but differs in that the bracts (located at the base of the flower head) taper to a long point.

Eupatorium album grows in dry, open areas such as power lines, old fields, and eroded slopes. It will not grow under a shady canopy, but can be found in some open woods such as pine barrens.

Varieties
Eupatorium album var. album - most of species range
Eupatorium album var. subvenosum A. Gray - Delaware, District of Columbia, New Jersey, New York 
Eupatorium album var. vaseyi (Porter) Cronquist - from Alabama to Pennsylvania

References

Further reading

External links
Alabama Plants, Photographs and information for the plants of Alabama, USA , including photos.
photo of herbarium specimen at Missouri Botanical Garden, collected in Missouri in 2012

album
Flora of the United States
Plants described in 1767